Rinn an Chaisleáin or Castle Point is a National Monument on Great Blasket Island, Ireland.

Location

Rinn an Chaisleáin is located directly north of Great Blasket's "Lower Village", to the west of the harbour.

History

From the end of the 13th Century the Norman-Irish Feiritéar (Ferriter) family leased the Blaskets from the Earls of Desmond (apparently in exchange for two hawks per year), and later from the Boyle Earls of Cork. Rinn an Chaisleáin was originally the site of a castle built by the Ferriters.

In 1840 a Protestant "soup-school" was built using the stones from the castle ruins; it closed in 1852.

Rinn an Chaisleáin remained in use as a calluragh (unconsecrated burial ground). All island families traced their ancestry to either Dunquin or Ventry, and so were buried on the mainland to rest with their families. In times of bad weather the island would be cut off from the mainland, and corpses remained unburied, sometimes for weeks. In extremis, bodies would be buried at Rinn an Chaisleáin. It was also used for the burial of unbaptised infants, suicides and shipwrecked sailors.

Some of the burial sites are marked by stones.

References

Religion in County Kerry
Archaeological sites in County Kerry
National Monuments in County Kerry